Dimorphoreicheia is a genus of beetles in the family Carabidae, containing the following species which are endemic to Sardinia:
Dimorphoreicheia relicta Magrini, 2004
Dimorphoreicheia vannii Magrini, Fancello & Leo, 2002

References

Scaritinae
Endemic fauna of Sardinia